Yadaneru, also written Jeteneru, refers to a tribe at one time thought to have existed in the Cape York Peninsula of northern Queensland.

Country
Norman Tindale states that the Yetteneru possessed tribal lands of about  centered around Saltwater Creek, in the southwest corner of Princess Charlotte Bay, and that their inland extension went to somewhere in the vicinity of Musgrave.

People
During ethnographic work by Tindale and H.M. Hale, reports reached them that a tribe of this name, once existed, whose grounds were along the Saltwater Creek and Annie River, somewhere west of the Kokolamalama inland from Princess Charlotte Bay. By that time the tribe, if it were an independent reality, verged on disappearing. The authors wrote that:
They are called the  " salt pan blackfellows"  by natives speaking English, and use a dialectic variation of Kokolamalama. They are nearly extinct, only one old man and five women remaining alive in 1927, There were two clans, one on the seashore and one inland, but little could be learned about them.'

Alternative names
 Yadaneru.
 Wurangung.
 Ompindamo.(?)

Notes

Citations

Sources

Aboriginal peoples of Queensland
Far North Queensland